"Catalyst" is a 1970 Australian TV play. It was a business drama with "CF Barnes" a nom de plume for an Australian novelist.

Premise
When minority shareholder Arthur Lambert moves out of the boardroom and becomes involved in the day-to-day running of the firm of Conquest Engineering, managing director Keyes and marketing manager Parrish start to wonder about the security of their jobs.

Cast
Tony Ward
Richard Parry
Peter Reynolds
John Warwick
Don Barkham
Brian Anderson
Kirsty Child

References

1970s Australian television plays
1970 television plays
1970 Australian television episodes
Australian Plays (season 2) episodes